The 2007 winners of the Torneo di Viareggio (in English, the Viareggio Tournament, officially the Viareggio Cup World Football Tournament Coppa Carnevale), the annual youth football tournament held in Viareggio, Tuscany, are listed below.

Format 

The 48 teams are seeded in 12 pools, split up into 6-pool groups. Each team from a pool meets the others in a single tie. The winning club from each pool and two best runners-up from both group A and group B progress to the final knockout stage. All matches in the final rounds are single tie. The Round of 16 envisions penalties and no extra time, while the rest of the final round matches include 30 minutes extra time and penalties to be played if the draw between teams still holds. Semifinal losing teams play 3rd-place final with penalties after regular time. The winning sides play the final with extra time and repeat the match if the draw holds.

Participating teams
Italian teams

  Ascoli
  Atalanta
  Benevento
  Chievo Verona
  Cesena
  Cisco Roma
  Empoli
  Fiorentina
  Genoa
  Gubbio
  Inter Milan
  Juventus
  Lecco
  Livorno
  Lazio
  Milan
  Modena
  Montichiari
  Napoli
  Palermo
  Parma
  Pergocrema
  Perugia
  Piacenza
  Pisa
  Serie D Representatives
  Reggina
  Roma
  Sampdoria
  Siena
  Torino
  Treviso
  Viareggio
  Vicenza

European teams

  Anderlecht
  Liberty Oradea
  San Marino
  OFK Belgrade
  Spartak Moscow
  Red Star Belgrade

Asian teams

  Maccabi Haifa
  Malaysian Indian
  Paxtakor

African Team
  A.S. De Camberene

American teams

  New York Stars
  Juventud
  Arroyo Seco
  Santos
  Santos Laguna

Oceanian teams
   APIA Tigers

Group stage

Group 1

Group 2

Group 3

Group 4

Group 5

Group 6

Group 7

Group 8

Group 9

Group 10

Group 11

Group 12

Knockout stage

Champions

Top goalscorers

7 goals
 Davide Lanzafame ( Juventus)

2 goals
 Beram Kayal ( Maccabi Haifa)

1 goal
 Kfir Dar ( Maccabi Haifa)
 Tomer Hemed ( Maccabi Haifa)

Footnotes

External links
 Official Site (Italian)
Results on RSSSF.COM

2007
2006–07 in Italian football
2006–07 in Serbian football
2006–07 in Belgian football
2006–07 in Romanian football
2006–07 in San Marino football
2006–07 in Israeli football
2006–07 in Mexican football
2006–07 in Argentine football
2006–07 in Uruguayan football
2007 in Brazilian football
2007 in Russian football
2007 in Malaysian football
2007 in American soccer
2007 in Australian soccer
2007 in Senegalese sport